The following lists contains all Maserati production car, racing car and concept car models.

The total number of cars built of a certain model prior 2001 often is difficult to determine. Figures vary with the source and even Maserati states different numbers for the same model. This information therefore has been kept off the list.

Road vehicles

Racing vehicles

Concept vehicles

The following is a list of concept and prototype cars that carry the name of Italian manufacturer Maserati, listed in the chronological order of their presentation.

References

Maserati
Maserati